The Special Administration of the Holy See (abbreviated ASSS) was a dicastery of the Roman Curia from 1929 to 1967. It was established by Pope Pius XI on 7 June 1929 to manage the ₤750 million in cash and 1,000 million in Italian government bonds transferred to the Holy See in implementation of the Financial Convention attached to the Lateran Treaty of 1929.

In 1967, Pope Paul VI combined the Special Administration of the Holy See and the Administration of the Property of the Holy See into one office, the Administration of the Patrimony of the Apostolic See, erected on 15 August 1967.

Directors
Bernardino Nogara (1929—1954)
Henri de Maillardoz (1954—1967)

Secretaries of the Cardinalitial Commission
 Alberto di Jorio (1940 — 1947)
 Nicola Canali (1952 — 1961)

References

Bibliography
Lo Bello, Nino (1968). The Vatican Empire. Trident Press, New York.
Pollard, John F. (1999). "The Vatican and the Wall Street Crash: Bernardino Nogara and the Papal Finances in the early 1930s." The Historical Journal, 42: 1077-1091.
Pollard, John F. (2005). Money and the Rise of the Modern Papacy: Financing the Vatican, 1850–1950. Cambridge University Press.
Malachi Martin - Rich Church, Poor Church (Putnam, New York, 1984) 
 Saba, Andrea Filippo. (2004). "LA SOCIETÀ COMMERCIALE D'ORIENTE ENTRE LA DIVERSIFICACIÓN Y LA SITUACIÓN ESTRATÉGICA INTERNACIONAL (1902-1935)". Historia Empresarial.

Economic history of the Holy See
Former departments of the Roman Curia
Administration of the Patrimony of the Apostolic See